Colin Herring (born 1 March 1953) is a New Zealand swimmer. He competed in two events at the 1972 Summer Olympics and is New Zealand Olympian number 280. His son Mark swam for New Zealand at the 2008 Summer Olympics.

References

External links
 

1953 births
Living people
New Zealand male freestyle swimmers
Olympic swimmers of New Zealand
Swimmers at the 1972 Summer Olympics
Swimmers from Auckland
20th-century New Zealand people
21st-century New Zealand people